The Chairman (President) of the Republic of the People's Republic of Bulgaria (Bulgarian: Председателят (Президентът) на Републиката) was the head of state of Bulgaria from 3 April 1990 to 22 January 1992. The office was known as the Chairman (President) of the People's Republic of Bulgaria until the word "People's" was dropped from the country's name on 15 November 1990. From that point on, the office was simply the Chairman (President) of the Republic of Bulgaria.

Origin 
In 1971 a new constitution was approved by a referendum and came into force on 18 May 1971. In the constitution a new state organ was formed: the State Council. This new organ effectively eclipsed the role of the National Assembly as it had both legislative and executive power. The State Council could issue decrees with full legal authority when the National Assembly was not in session, with no provision for later approval by the full legislative body. The chairman of the State Council served as de facto head of state.

Following a wave of democratization in Eastern Europe in 1989, dictator Todor Zhivkov was forced to resign on 10 November, succeeded by Petar Mladenov. The following month the Communist Party announced it was giving up power and began a series of round table talks with the opposition on the transition to democracy. It was decided that the State Council would have to be abolished and the office of the Chairman (President) of the Republic would have to be inaugurated.

Powers and duties 

The powers and duties of the office were outlined in Chapter 5 of the 1971 constitution, as amended in 1990.

Office Holders 

On 3 April 1990 Petar Mladenov, having previously served as the Chairman of the State Council, was elected as the first President of Bulgaria, serving until his resignation in July. His resignation came after a video surfaced suggesting the use of tanks against anti-government demonstration in December 1989.

Stanko Todorov was selected to serve as acting President until a successor could be chosen. He too, had to be replaced by another acting president, Nikolai Todorov, following his resignation due to health reasons. Finally, on 1 August a compromise was reached and Zhelyu Zhelev, until then leader of the opposition party, the Union of Democratic Forces, was elected president. Zhelev was in office until he was sworn in on 22 January 1992 as President of Bulgaria, under the new constitution, following his direct election by the public three days before.

References 

:bg:Държавен съвет на Народна република България

People's Republic of Bulgaria
Bulgarian politicians
Government of Bulgaria
Heads of state of Bulgaria